Euscirrhopterus is a genus of moths of the family Noctuidae.

Species
 Euscirrhopterus cosyra Druce, 1896
 Euscirrhopterus discifera Hampson, 1901
 Euscirrhopterus gloveri Grote & Robinson, 1868
 Euscirrhopterus klagesi Jordan, 1908
 Euscirrhopterus poeyi Grote, 1866
 Euscirrhopterus valkeri Hampson, 1901

References
 Euscirrhopterus at Markku Savela's Lepidoptera and Some Other Life Forms
 Natural History Museum Lepidoptera genus database

Agaristinae